The Paris metropolitan area has a community of origins from Sub-Saharan Africa. There were 54,000 persons of African nationalities, excluding Algeria, Morocco, and Tunisia, according to the 2009 French census. Countries of origin in sub-Saharan Africa include Burkina Faso, the Democratic Republic of the Congo, Guinea, Mali, and Senegal.

There was a significant increase in persons of sub-Saharan African origins residing in Paris from 1960 to 1992.

Geography
As of circa 1995 the favored locations for sub-Saharan African settlement in the city of Paris included the 18th, 19th, and 20th arrondissements. In addition the following suburban municipalities had African settlement: Charenton, Issy-les-Moulineaux, Ivry-sur-Seine, Montreuil, and Pantin.

Montreuil's inhabitants often exaggeratedly nickname the town the "second Malian town after Bamako", or sometimes "Mali-sous-Bois" or "Bamako-sur-Seine" even though the Seine does not run through the town.

Culture

The musical style coupé-décalé emphasizes the relationship between Abidjan, Ivory Coast and Paris.

Notable persons
 Luc Abalo
 Oumar Bakari
 Amedy Coulibaly 
 Bira Dembélé
 Mana Dembélé
 Alou Diarra
 Boukary Dramé
 Tripy Makonda
 André Matsoua
 Dany N'Guessan
 Bakary Sako
 Mamadou Samassa (footballer born 1990)
 Oumar Sissoko
 Alassane També
 Bano Traoré
 Ibrahima Traoré
 Makan Traore (footballer born 1992)

See also
 La Goutte d'Or - African immigrant neighbourhood of Paris
 Africans in Guangzhou

References
 Jules-Rosette, Bennetta. Black Paris: The African Writers' Landscape (World literature: Cultural studies). University of Illinois Press, 2000. , 9780252069352.

Notes

  Montreuil, Seine-Saint-Denis

Further reading
 Cazenave, Odile. Afrique sur Seine: a New Generation of African Writers in Paris (After the Empire: the Francophone World and Postcolonial France). Lexington Books, 15 January 2007. , 9780739120637.
 Dadié, Bernard Binlin. An African in Paris. University of Illinois Press, 1 January 1994. , 9780252064074.
 Jenkins, Jennifer. West Africans in Paris. Lightning Source Incorporated, 2008. , 9783836497268.
 "African culture in 'City of Romance'." CNN. November 5, 2012 - Video
 Baarakètò (Documentary Short Film Series). An ka taa, 2022.

African diaspora in Paris
History of Paris